Les Assassins du dimanche is a French drama film made in 1956. It is directed by Alex Joffé, written by Alex Joffé and stars Barbara Laage.

Cast 
 Barbara Laage : Simone Simonet
 Dominique Wilms : Ginette Garcet
 Jean-Marc Thibault : Robert Simonet 
 Paul Frankeur : Lucien Simonet
 Georges Poujouly : Julot
 Paul Préboist

References

External links 
 

1950s French-language films
French black-and-white films
1950s French films
French drama films
1956 drama films